Julius Raliukonis (born 2 November 1976) is a Lithuanian footballer who is a defender for SV Sparkasse Aschach an der Donau.

Career

In 2007, Raliukonis trialed for St Mirren in the Scottish top flight

In 2008, he trialed for English second division sides Colchester United and Blackpool after playing for Livingston in the Scottish second division.

In 2009, he signed for Austrian second division club Dornbirn from Bad Aussee in the Austrian third division.

In 2010, Raliukonis signed for Austrian fourth division team UFC Eferding.

In 2020, he signed for SV Sparkasse Aschach an der Donau as a player-coach in the Austrian eighth division after playing for Austrian seventh division team SV Gramastetten..

References

External links

 

Lithuanian footballers
Living people
Association football defenders
Lithuanian expatriates in Austria
Scottish Professional Football League players
Livingston F.C. players
Expatriate footballers in Austria
A Lyga players
1976 births
FK Vėtra players
FC Dornbirn 1913 players
SV Bad Aussee players
Austrian Regionalliga players
FK Atlantas players
Lithuanian expatriates in Scotland
Lithuanian expatriate footballers